Tun Tavern Restaurant & Brewery is a brewpub in Atlantic City in Atlantic County, New Jersey. The brewery opened to the public in 1998 and was named for the historical Tun Tavern, a colonial establishment located in Philadelphia from 1685–1781. The brewery produced 550 barrels of beer in 2006.

Beers and other products
Tun Tavern specializes in the production of English, Irish, German, and American-style beers. Common beer styles made at the brewery include Berlin-style Weisse and hefeweizen, red ales, seasonal beers, weizenbocks, and west coast IPAs featuring hops grown locally in New Jersey.

Licensing and associations
Tun Tavern has a restricted brewery license from the New Jersey Division of Alcoholic Beverage Control, which allows it to produce up to 10,000 barrels of beer per year, to sell on-premises, to wholesalers, and at festivals in the state, and to offer samples at off-premises charitable or civic events. The brewery is a member of the Garden State Craft Brewers Guild.

See also

Alcohol laws of New Jersey
Beer in New Jersey
Beer in the United States
List of wineries, breweries, and distilleries in New Jersey

References

Beer brewing companies based in New Jersey
Tourist attractions in Atlantic County, New Jersey
1998 establishments in New Jersey